Torgiano is a comune (municipality) in the Province of Perugia in the Italian region Umbria, located about 10 km southeast of Perugia.

Torgiano borders the following municipalities: Bastia Umbra, Bettona, Deruta, Perugia.

History 
Probably founded by the Etruscans, Torgiano is situated on a hill overlooking the confluence of the Chiascio and Tiber rivers. In Roman times it was called Turris Amnium.

Torgiano DOC
The Italian wine DOC around Torgiano produced red and white blends, as well as varietal Cabernet Sauvignon and Chardonnay wines, provided the named grapes account for at least 85% of the wine. Grapes for DOC production are limited to harvest yields of 12 tonnes/ha with finished red wines needing a minimum alcohol level of 12% and finished whites needing at least 10.5% alcohol. The DOC red wines are blends of 50-70% Sangiovese, 15-30% Canaiolo, 10% Trebbiano, and up to 10% of Ciliegiolo and Montepulciano. The whites are blends of 50-70% Trebbiano, 15-35% Grechetto and up  to 15% of Malvasia and Verdello.

Torgiano Rosso Riserva DOCG
Within the DOC 160 ha (499 acres) in the nearby hills received a special designation to produce a DOCG red wine. Grapes designated for this wine are further restricted to 10 tonnes/ha, a minimum alcohol level of 12.5% and must be aged at least 3 years prior to release. The blending components are mostly similar to the DOC wine in regards to the percentages of Sangiovese and Canaiolo but differ in that now collectively Trebbiano, Ciliegiolo and Montepulciano can not account for more than 10% of the blend.

Main sights
The ancient part of town is still partly surrounded by medieval walls. The Torre di Guardia, a defensive tower dating back to the 13th century, is situated outside the walls.

Other sights include:

 San Bartolomeo church.
 Oratory of St. Anthony  (16th century) with frescos of the Domenico Alfani school.
 Museo del vino (Wine museum)
 Museo dell'olivo e dell'olio (Olive and oil museum)
 La Strada del Vino e dell’Arte – the Wine and Art Itinerary to Brufa.
 Brufa with its sculptures.

Culture

Torgiano was the first winemaking area in Umbria to obtain the DOC mark (Denomination of Origin) in 1968. In 1990 the Vino Torgiano was also certified as DOCG (Guaranteed Denomination of Origin). The town is a member of the Strada dei Vini del Cantico.

Other well known products from Torgiano are olive oil, terracotta, lace and embroidery.

One of the most inventive and progressive winemakers of Torgiano, Giorgio Lungarotti, together with his wife Maria Grazia, set up a foundation and conceived and created the Wine Museum, which opened in 1974 for the first time. The Olive Oil Museum in Torgiano is also part of the Lugarotti foundation.

There is a town soccer team in Torgiano named AC Torgiano, the soccer team is made up of the children who are residents of the town itself. The boys who play on the team are great friends and include teamwork in their everyday practice.

Events 
 Gustando il borgo - spring festival (Easter)
 Infiorata del Corpus Domini
 Calici di Stelle - Food and wine review Torgiano, tastings of wine and typical products. - (August, 10 - national winetasting congress (November - December)
 Mostra d'arte “Vaselle d'autore per il vino novello” – festival of the new wine (November)
 Festa dell’Olio Nuovo – festival of the new olive oil (December)

References

External links
 www.comune.torgiano.pg.it
 Strada dei Vini del Cantico
 Vinarelli, art initiative
 Olive Oil Museum
 Wine Museum
 Banco d’Assaggio dei Vini d’Italia, national wine congress
 Pro Loco Brufa in Italian

Cities and towns in Umbria